The 2010 City of Lincoln Council election took place on 6 May 2010 to elect members of City of Lincoln Council in Lincolnshire, England. This was held on the same day as other local elections, as well as the  parliamentary general election. One third 33 seats were up for election, with one councillor in each of the 11 wards being elected. As the previous election in 2008 had  been an all-out election with new ward boundaries, the seats of the candidates that had finished third in each ward in 2016 were up for election. The Conservative Party retained control of the council.

Election result

|-
| colspan=2 style="text-align: right; margin-right: 1em" | Total
| style="text-align: right;" | 12
| colspan=5 |
| style="text-align: right;" | 39,131
| style="text-align: right;" |

Ward results

Abbey

Birchwood

Boultham

Bracebridge

Carholme

Castle

Glebe

Hartsholme

Minster

Moorland (2 seats)

Park

References

2010 English local elections
2010
2010s in Lincolnshire